A peptide library is a tool for studying proteins.  Peptide libraries contain a great number of peptides that have a systematic combination of amino acids. Usually, the peptide library is synthesized on a solid phase, mostly on resin, which can be made as a flat surface or beads. The peptide library provides a powerful tool for drug design, protein–protein interactions, and other biochemical and pharmaceutical applications.

Synthetic peptide libraries are synthesized without utilizing phage or other biological systems. At least five subtypes of these libraries exist, and the distinguishing characteristic is the method of synthesis of each library. The subtypes are (1) overlapping peptide libraries, (2) truncation peptide libraries, (3) random libraries, (4) alanine scanning libraries, and (5) positional or scrambled peptide libraries.

The practicality of this form of peptide synthesis is limited as the peptide chain length is limited to approximately 70 amino acids. This makes it unsuitable for the study of larger proteins. For 20 amino acids this results in an upper limit of 2070 possible combinations, not considering the plethora of available amino acids with pre-installed post-translational modifications. From this great number of total combinations, the scope of the peptide library can be narrowed down for a more specific purpose by selecting which amino acids are desired at each point in the chain.

For example: a peptide chain of 10 residues in length used in native chemical ligation with a larger recombinantly expressed protein. 

 Residue 1: alanine
 Residue 2: one of glutamine, glycine, arginine, glutamic acid, serine, or methionine
 Residue 3: any one of the 20 amino acids
 Residue 4: acetyllysine
 Residue 5: alanine
 Residue 6: isoleucine
 Residue 7: aspartic acid
 Residue 8: phenylalanine
 Residue 9: acetyllysine
 Residue 10: arginine with the carboxy terminal thioester

With 7 possibilities at Residue 2 and 20 possibilities at Residue 3, the total would be  or 140 different polypeptides in the library.

This peptide library would be useful for analyzing the effect of the post-translational modification acetylation on lysine which neutralizes the positive charge. Having the library of different peptides at residue 2 and 3 would let you see if some change in chemical properties in the N-terminal tail of the ligated protein makes the protein more useful or useful in a different way.

Large random peptide libraries are often used for the synthesis of certain peptide molecules, such as ultra-large chemical libraries for the discovery of high-affinity peptide binders, and an increase in the library size severely affects parameters, such as the synthesis scale, the number of library members, the sequence deconvolution and peptide structure elucidation. So, to address these technical challenges, an algorithm-supported approach to peptide library design based on molecular mass and amino acid diversity is proposed in order to simplify the laborious permutation identification in complex mixtures, when mass spectrometry is used, by avoiding mass redundancy. 

Some companies, such as Pepscan, and GenScript, manufacture customized peptide libraries.

References

Further reading 
 Peptide library at pbcpeptide.com 

Biochemistry methods
Proteins